Navneet Kaur (born 26 January 1996 at Shahabad Markanda) is an Indian field hockey player. She plays as a forward for the Indian national team and has 100 international caps to her credit.

Navneet was part of the Indian team that won a silver at the 2018 Asian Games.

On 8 April 2022, she made her 100th international appearance in the 2021-22 Women's FIH Pro League match against the Netherlands team. She also won the Player of the Match award for her performance against the Dutch team.

She is presently employed with Western Railway of the Indian Railways.

References

External links

Navneet Kaur at Hockey India

1996 births
Living people
Indian female field hockey players
Female field hockey forwards
Field hockey players from Haryana
Sportswomen from Haryana
Field hockey players at the 2020 Summer Olympics
Olympic field hockey players of India
Field hockey players at the 2018 Asian Games
Asian Games silver medalists for India
Asian Games medalists in field hockey
Medalists at the 2018 Asian Games
Field hockey players at the 2018 Commonwealth Games
Field hockey players at the 2022 Commonwealth Games
Commonwealth Games bronze medallists for India
Commonwealth Games medallists in field hockey
Medallists at the 2022 Commonwealth Games